Kryniczno may refer to the following places in Poland:
Kryniczno in Gmina Środa Śląska, Środa Śląska County in Lower Silesian Voivodeship (SW Poland)
Kryniczno in Gmina Wisznia Mała, Trzebnica County in Lower Silesian Voivodeship (SW Poland)